The 1946 United States Senate election in Massachusetts was held on November 5, 1946. Incumbent Democratic Senator David I. Walsh ran for re-election to a fifth term in office, but was defeated by Republican former Senator Henry Cabot Lodge Jr., who returned from service in World War II.

A Republican would not win Massachusetts' Class 1 Senate seat again until 2010, when Scott Brown was elected to serve a partial term. As of 2022, this remains the last time that a Republican has won a full term in this seat.

Background
Henry Cabot Lodge Jr. was elected to two terms in the U.S. Senate in 1936 and 1942, but resigned during his second term to serve in World War II. With the completion of the war in Europe, Lodge returned to Massachusetts and to politics.

David I. Walsh had served four terms in office since his election as an ally of Woodrow Wilson in 1916 but had alienated New Deal supporters by opposing the labor and social reform measures of the Second New Deal. He was also embroiled in a personal scandal after the owner of a Brooklyn homosexual brothel allegedly frequented by German spies had sworn under oath that Walsh was his client. Though J. Edgar Hoover cleared Walsh of any wrongdoing, the scandal hung over his head.

Democratic primary

Candidates
 David I. Walsh, incumbent Senator since 1926

Results
Senator Walsh was unopposed for the Democratic nomination. Despite the brothel scandal, he faced no opposition at the Democratic convention, which was the shortest recorded. The convention started at 2 P.M., to allow delegates to attend the funeral of Walsh's sister Hannah, and finished by 5 P.M. Walsh did not attend and there was no debate over his nomination, though Attorney General nominee Paul Dever devoted his own speech to praising Walsh's record.

Republican primary

Candidates
 Henry Cabot Lodge Jr., former Senator (1937–44)

Results
Lodge was unopposed for the Republican nomination. He was heavily recruited by the state Republican Party, which sought to counter the supposed popularity of Walsh and Governor Maurice J. Tobin. A formal declaration of candidacy was submitted to the Secretary of the Commonwealth in April.

General election

Candidates
 Henning A. Blomen, perennial candidate (Socialist Labor)
 Henry Cabot Lodge Jr., former Senator (1937–44) (Republican)
 Mark R. Shaw, temperance activist and pastor from Beverly (Prohibition)
 David I. Walsh, incumbent Senator since 1926

Campaign
Lodge, who considered Walsh a family friend, avoided mentioning his opponent's alleged homosexuality or impropriety. He centered his campaign on criticism of postwar economic conditions, arguing that inflation, labor strife, and consumer goods shortages were leading the country toward "another depression."

Results

Lodge carried every county and the city of Boston.

Notes

References

Massachusetts
1946
1946 Massachusetts elections